The Hardy Boys is a mystery drama television series, based on The Hardy Boys book series created by Edward Stratemeyer. The show is produced by Nelvana and Lambur Productions. The first season was released on Hulu on December 4, 2020, and the second season was released on April 6, 2022. The show went into production for a third, and final, season in October 2022 according to Variety.com.

The series stars Alexander Elliot, Rohan Campbell, Jennifer Hsiung, Keana Lyn, Riley O'Donnell, Bea Santos, and Adam Swain as the main characters. Filming took place mainly in Ontario, Canada, with featured locations including Cambridge, Port Hope, and Hamilton.

Premise 
The Hardy Boys follows two brothers, Frank and Joe Hardy, alongside their friends and father, trying to disclose the truth about something quite menacing happening right in their own town of Bridgeport.

Cast and characters

Main 

 Rohan Campbell as Frank Hardy
 Alexander Elliot as Joe Hardy
 James Tupper (season 1)  and Anthony Lemke (season 2) as Fenton Hardy
 Keana Lyn Bastidas as Callie Shaw
 Linda Thorson as Gloria Estabrook
 Bea Santos as Aunt Trudy
 Adam Swain as Chet Morton
 Cristian Perri as Phil Cohen
 Atticus Mitchell as JB Cox
 Riley O'Donnell as Elizabeth "Biff" Hooper
 Sadie Munroe as Lucy
 Laara Sadiq as Kanika Khan

Recurring 

 Janet Porter as Laura Hardy
 Stephen R. Hart as The Tall Man
 Saad Siddiqui as Rupert Khan
 Rachel Drance as Stacy Baker/Anastasia Nabokov
 Jennifer Hsiung (season 1) and Alli Chung (season 2) as Jesse Hooper
 Frank Licari as Paul McFarlane
 Bill Lake as Ezra Collig
 Philip Williams as Wilt
 Ric Garcia as Stefan
 Charolette Lai as Sandra
 Jim Codrington as  Sam Peterson
 Sean Dolan as Ern Cullmore
 Tara Paterson as Shawna Meyer
 Joan Gregson as Anya Kowalski
 Mark Sparks as Nigel
 Philip Craig as George Estabrook
 Marvin Kaye as Sergei Nabokov
 Vijay Mehta as Ahmed Kahn

Episodes

Series overview

Season 1 (2020)

Season 2 (2022)

Production 
The series was announced in September 2019, and slated to be released on streaming service provider Hulu the next year. At the same time, Jason Stone and Steve Cochrane were set as part of the show's development. The Hardy Boys is based on the fictional book series of the same name written by multiple authors. A trailer was released in November 2020. The first season of The Hardy Boys premiered on Hulu in the United States on December 4, 2020, and consisted of 13 episodes. It began airing weekly on March 5, 2021 on YTV in Canada. The Hardy Boys was filmed in Ontario, Canada, with Cambridge serving as a featured location, and other settings including Port Hope and Hamilton. Almost the entirety of the cast were announced at once upon the series' December 4 release.

References

External links 
 
 

2020s American drama television series
2020s American mystery television series
2020s American supernatural television series
2020 American television series debuts
2020s Canadian drama television series
2020 Canadian television series debuts
YTV (Canadian TV channel) original programming
English-language television shows
Murder in television
Television shows based on American novels
Television shows based on The Hardy Boys
Television series about brothers
Television series about teenagers
Television series by Nelvana
Television shows filmed in Hamilton, Ontario
Television series reboots
Hulu original programming